These are the results of the athletics competition at the 2014 Pan American Sports Festival which took place from August 15 to 16, 2014 at the Estadio Jesús Martínez “Palillo” in Mexico City, Mexico.

Men's results

100 meters

Heats – 15 August

Final – 15 August – Wind: -1.3 m/s

200 meters

Heats – 16 August 

Final – 16 August – Wind: +0.6 m/s

400 meters

Heats – 15 August 

Final – 16 August

800 meters
Final – 16 August

1500 meters
Final – 16 August

5000 meters
Final – 16 August

3000 meters steeplechase
Final – 15 August

110 meters hurdles

Heats – 16 August

Final – 16 August – Wind: -0.1 m/s

400 meters hurdles
Final – 16 August

High jump
Final – 16 August

Pole vault
Final – 15 August

Long jump
Final – 15 August

Triple jump
Final – 16 August

Shot put
Final – 16 August

Discus throw
Final – 15 August

Hammer throw
Final – 16 August

Javelin throw
Final – 16 August

Women's results

100 meters

Heats – 15 August

Final – 15 August – Wind: -2.5 m/s

200 meters

Heats – 16 August 

Final – 16 August – Wind: +2.1 m/s

400 meters

Heats – 15 August 

Final – 16 August

800 meters
Final – 16 August

1500 meters
Final – 15 August

5000 meters
Final – 15 August

3000 meters steeplechase
Final – 16 August

100 meters hurdles

Heats – 16 August

Final – 16 August – Wind: +0.9 m/s

400 meters hurdles
Final – 16 August

High jump
Final – 15 August

Pole vault
Final – 16 August

Long jump
Final – 15 August

Triple jump
Final – 16 August

Shot put
Final – 15 August

Discus throw
Final – 16 August

Hammer throw
Final – 15 August

Javelin throw
Final – 15 August

References

Pan American Sports Festival